is a Japanese manga series by Shimoku Kio about a college club for otaku (extremely obsessed fans of various media) and the lifestyle its members pursue. The title is a shortening of the club's official name, or "The Society for the Study of Modern Visual Culture". The series has also been adapted into an anime directed by Tsutomu Mizushima. The manga originally ran in Kodansha's magazine Monthly Afternoon from April 2002 to May 2006, and has been reprinted in nine bound volumes.

A two-part short bonus story was included across both volumes of the Kujibiki Unbalance manga, published in 2006.

In December 2009, a new chapter was released in Monthly Afternoon to celebrate the release of the Genshiken 2 DVD box-set.

Overview

Themes

The series focuses on the otaku lifestyle and contains numerous references to other manga, anime, video games, and other aspects of otaku culture. Common plot points include such otaku-centric activities as the buying and creation of dōjinshi, fan-made manga usually of erotic content; convincing a character to try cosplay (dressing up as characters from manga, anime, or video games); the creation of plamo (plastic models that must be assembled); visiting Akihabara, Tokyo's electronics shopping district; or attending the biannual Comic Festival ("Comifes"), a reference to Comic Market ("Comiket"), Japan's single largest anime- and manga-focused fan convention.

Since the anime is co-produced by Sega Sammy Holdings, the Guilty Gear video game series is heavily referenced, with actual gameplay sequences being shown multiple times, Ohno cosplaying as Kuradoberi Jam, and other minor references. The Sega puzzle game Puyo Puyo also serves as an important plot point as Kasukabe tries to gain Kousaka's attention. Numerous other non-Sega/Sammy properties are also referenced throughout the anime, but their names are changed slightly, such as The King of Fighters '95 being alluded to as COF 95 and Capcom vs SNK 2 as "S-Cup". Discussion of eroge, erotic video games usually of the visual novel genre, also occurs often.

Similar to the treatment of video games in the series, popular anime, and manga are often alluded to by pseudonyms, such as "Gungal" (Gundam), "Reass Mood" (Code Geass), "Haregan" (Fullmetal Alchemist), "Scram Dunk" (Slam Dunk), "Neko Yasha" (InuYasha), and many others. Genshiken usually avoids referring to these series so in-depth that it would require the use of names and lines from their real-world counterparts, with several notable exceptions: in the model-building chapter of the manga (but not the anime), actual Gundam mecha and characters are referred to throughout, while the dialogue quoted by Sue (except for one "Neko Yasha!" outburst) is pulled directly from Evangelion, Lupin III, Azumanga Daioh, and other series.

These cultural references have remained intact for the English adaption of the manga, which includes a section for translation notes. However, due to the number of allusions made and the inability of a translator to always know what is being referred to, many explanations of otaku references are still absent. The anime, however, has been criticized for having "excessive script variances" with its English dub translations, such as injecting English-specific references like "talk to the hand" and for inconsistently including liner notes.

Ramen Angel Pretty Menma

Another fictitious series created for the series is Ramen Angel Pretty Menma, a generic adult visual novel. Mentioned in passing as Sasahara's first such game in the manga, it is given much greater emphasis in the second TV series. The plot revolves around Kaoru Torigara, the only son of a ramen shop owner, who is going to renovate his inherited ramen shop. He discovers that his shop has a guardian angel named Pretty Menma. Pretty Menma tells Kaoru that his dead father's intention is making him succeed in the "Food King Wars", a battle of restaurants around the world that is held every 4 years. Kaoru and Menma must help each other to go through the struggles of the "Food King Wars". In the anime, there is also Ramen Angel Pretty Menma 2, which continues from the first version. Additionally, the third version of the opening sequence (that uses the same song, but adds scenes and edits existing ones) shows Ogiue cosplaying Pretty Menma, Ohno cosplaying Cutie Tonko (another heroine in this series who represents tonkotsu, a form of ramen broth), and Kasukabe cosplaying Menma's mother. This series is also spun off into its own Internet radio show, manga (serialized in Monthly Comic Alive) and a drama CD.

Plot

Genshiken follows the lives of a group of college students drawn together by their shared hobbies, and the trials and adventures associated with being otaku. The story begins with the introduction of Kanji Sasahara, a shy, confidence-lacking freshman who on club day at university, decides to join a club he would actually enjoy, Genshiken. Over his four years at Shiiou University, Sasahara comes to accept himself for who he is and loses the inhibitions and guilt he once felt and associated with otaku culture, becoming an enthusiastic club member, and for a time, a capable club president. As the story of Genshiken progresses, focus is also placed on Saki Kasukabe, a determined non-otaku who initially struggles to drag her boyfriend Kousaka out of the club, and Chika Ogiue, a self-professed otaku-hater who feels a deep-seated shame and self-loathing toward her own interests and hobbies.

During the course of the series, the reader bears witness as the group grows in its cohesiveness over time, and bonds form between the characters as they begin to see themselves as more than fellow club members, but friends as well. In this context, club activities such as group outings, the biannual pilgrimage to Comifes, and even simply hanging out in the clubroom, allow the characters' complex relationships to grow into friendship, infatuation, and at times, even love. While a few of them never quite see eye-to-eye about their interests or the lives they lead, they are held together by the bonds of friendship that they share.

Second Generation
After Sasahara, Kousaka and Kasukabe graduate, the series shifts focus to three new club members: The self-conscious Yajima, the energetic-yet-annoying Yoshitake, and Hato, a fudanshi who cross-dresses to fit in better and go unrecognized by his normal classmates. Emphasis is also put on the character of Madarame, a former president of the club who actually graduated a year before Sasahara, but remained in the club due to working and having an apartment nearby, hanging out in the clubroom in his time off as he struggles to grow up and move on from university.

Characters

Media
Manga

Anime

The manga was brought to television by the production company Genco through animation studio Palm in 2004 as a 12-episode anime and in 2006 and 2007 as 3-episode OVA, adapting the first five volumes of the manga. The TV series was licensed for North American release by Media Blasters.

The anime adaptation is very faithful to the original work, with few revisions being made, with the exception that many references to specific anime, manga, and video games are changed or removed. The previously fictional Kujibiki Unbalance manga series was also turned into an anime series to match the medium, with three complete episodes being created for sampling in the anime version of Genshiken. The three Kujibiki Unbalance episodes are provided as bonus OVAs with the purchase of the Genshiken DVDs.

It was originally announced by Media Factory at Comiket 69 that the second TV series of Genshiken would premiere in October 2006. However, Media Factory clarified their statement in May 2006, saying that the series airing in the fall would be a full-fledged Kujibiki Unbalance series, rather than a Genshiken sequel. Nevertheless, the DVD releases of the new Kujibiki Unbalance series each included an OVA episode of Genshiken, for a total of three new episodes. The first new episode was released with Kujibiki Unbalance DVD Box 1 on December 22, 2006, with the two subsequent installments following on February 23 and April 25, 2007, respectively.

On April 23, 2007, it was announced on the Genshiken homepage that a second anime television series would be produced, including the character Ogiue, who had been introduced in the OVA episodes. The first episode of the second series aired on October 11, 2007 on Japanese TV. A radio webcast ran simultaneously with the terrestrial broadcast. The final episode of the series aired on December 27, 2007; however, it did not conclude the story.

The TV version of Genshiken 2 aired with minor censorship. Oddly though, the censorship was that of a highly erotic kiss that involved no nudity. Additional nudity like breast nipples and strong cleavage was also censored. The DVD version shows everything uncensored.

In the March issue of Monthly Afternoon it was announced that a new anime had been authorized for Genshiken: Second Season. The new anime sequel is directed by Tsutomu Mizushima at Production I.G, with Michiko Yokote handling the series composition. The series premiered on July 7, 2013 and includes the opening song "Genshi, Joshi wa, Taiyo Datta" by Sumire Uesaka and the band Kabuki Rocks. At Anime Expo 2013, NIS America announced their acquisition of Genshiken: Second Season, licensed under the title Genshiken: Second Generation, for release in North America.

A Genshiken: Second Generation OAD (Original Animation DVD) was bundled with the limited edition of the 15th volume of the Genshiken manga, released in Dec 20, 2013. The story is set between the events of the Genshiken 2 and Genshiken: Second Generation series.

Drama CD
There has been three drama CD bundled together with different media in the series. The first one was released as a "first press" item for the 9th volume of the manga, while the two others were included in the two first volumes of the "Genshiken 2" DVDs.

List of releases:

 1. Genshiken Dai 9 kan: Tokusōban Drama CD 
 2. Dai 8.5 wa 'Otaku Shigan... Mitai na?'
 3. Bangai hen 'Road to Ikebukuro (kari)'

Light novel
In 2008, Kodansha released the light novel "Shoron Genshiken: Hairu Ranto no Yabou", with Del Rey releasing the book in June 2010. The book introduces the character of Ranto Hairu, the rich grandson of one of Japan's most influential businessmen, as he takes over the student club organization with the intention of getting rid of any elements he views as unsavory. Meanwhile, a supernatural force is slowly abducting members of Genshiken without a trace.

Chronologically the book falls just after certain events in the second volume, although few of the book's events follow the story elements already established in the series. Changes such as Kuchiki remaining with the Genshiken after his initial attempts to join, the established president of the student club organization drops out due to pregnancy, as well as Ohno and Tanaka's relationship being more established than it was during this point in time. The light novel also introduces several characters that are only present in the novel itself and do not appear in the anime or manga. Also of note is that there are several elements present in the book (such as the supernatural) that are not present in the anime or manga.

Reception

Genshiken has been praised for its execution of the slice-of-life genre, in that it is able to be funny while still maintaining a strong sense of reality. Anime News Network reviewer Bamboo Dong's review of the first manga volume called Genshiken "one of the best manga series out this year", praising Shimoku Kio's attention to detail and David Ury's translation work. Genshiken was also selected as one of the Manga Division Jury Recommended Works in the 2005 Japan Media Arts Festival.

See also
Comic Party
Otaku no Video
Cosplay Complex

References and notes
 : The series Puyo Pop is known as Puyo Puyo in Japan. Also, the specific game played is different for each medium: in the manga, it's Puyo Puyo 2, and in the anime, it's Puyo Puyo Fever.

External links
  
  
  
  
  
 

2004 anime television series debuts
2006 anime OVAs
2007 anime television series debuts
2008 Japanese novels
2000s college television series
2010 manga
2013 anime television series debuts
2010s college television series
Ajia-do Animation Works
Anime Works
Arms Corporation
Bandai Namco franchises
Comedy anime and manga
Cross-dressing in anime and manga
Del Rey Manga
Kodansha books
Kodansha manga
Manga creation in anime and manga
Otaku in fiction
Production I.G
School life in anime and manga
Seinen manga
Slice of life anime and manga